Hurricane Creek is a stream in Butler, Carter and Ripley counties of southern Missouri. A tributary of Tenmile Creek.

The community of Milltowm in western Butler County is located on the banks of the stream.

Hurricane Creek was so named on account of a tornado which struck the area in the 1850s.

See also
List of rivers of Missouri

References

Rivers of Butler County, Missouri
Rivers of Carter County, Missouri
Rivers of Ripley County, Missouri
Rivers of Missouri